Attalea tessmannii is a species of flowering plant in the family Arecaceae. It is found in Brazil and Peru. It is threatened by habitat loss.

References

tessmannii
Trees of Brazil
Trees of Peru
Near threatened plants
Taxonomy articles created by Polbot
Taxa named by Max Burret